My Weekly is a magazine for women. Published by D. C. Thomson & Co. Ltd of Dundee, Scotland. It tends to consist of short stories, reader contributions, knitting or sewing patterns, and celebrity gossip. There are no real life horror stories.

The publication originated as a newspaper. It was purchased by the Thomson brothers early in the twentieth century, and was relaunched as a magazine in 1910.

Thomson also publishes a similarly named collection of stories titled My Weekly Story Collection, and an annual at the end of the year titled The Best of My Weekly.

See also
 List of magazines published in Scotland

References

External links

Weekly magazines published in the United Kingdom
Women's magazines published in the United Kingdom
Celebrity magazines published in the United Kingdom
Magazines established in 1910
Mass media in Dundee
Magazines published in Scotland